Kouibly Department is a department of Guémon Region in Montagnes District, Ivory Coast. In 2021, its population was 144,723 and its seat is the settlement of Kouibly. The sub-prefectures of the department are Kouibly, Nidrou, Ouyably-Gnondrou, and Totrodrou.

History

Kouibly Department was created in 2005 as a second-level subdivision via a split-off from Man Department. At its creation, it was part of Dix-Huit Montagnes Region.

In 2011, districts were introduced as new first-level subdivisions of Ivory Coast. At the same time, regions were reorganised and became second-level subdivisions and all departments were converted into third-level subdivisions. At this time, Kouibly Department became part of Guémon Region in Montagnes District.

In 2012, five sub-prefectures were split-off from Kouibly Department to create Facobly Department.

Notes

Departments of Guémon
2005 establishments in Ivory Coast
States and territories established in 2005